Tomorrowland is the third album by the Australian power metal band Black Majesty. A Limited Special Edition was also released which included two bonus tracks, a poster, a sticker, additional photos and personal liner notes by the band. Copies of this edition were limited to 4,000 copies worldwide.

Track listing

 "Forever Damned" - 5:10
 "Into the Black" - 5:08
 "Evil in Your Eyes" - 5:14
 "Tomorrowland" - 4:48
 "Soldier of Fortune" - 3:25 (Deep Purple cover)
 "Bleeding World" - 5:15
 "Faces of War" - 5:35
 "Wings to Fly" - 5:01
 "Another Dawn" - 5:08
 "Scars" - 4:57

Special Edition bonus tracks:
 "Kingdoms" - 4:15
 "Memories" - 5:37

Credits

Band members
 John "Gio" Cavaliere − lead vocals
 Stevie Janevski − guitars, backing vocals
 Hanny Mohamed − guitars, keyboards
 Pavel Konvalinka  − drums

2007 albums
Black Majesty albums
Limb Music albums